Eustigma is a genus of flowering plants belonging to the family Hamamelidaceae.

Its native range is Southern Central China to Northern Vietnam.

Species:

Eustigma balansae 
Eustigma honbaense 
Eustigma lenticellatum 
Eustigma oblongifolium

References

Hamamelidaceae
Saxifragales genera